Earl Fred Bennett (November 5, 1919 – October 4, 2007) was an American comic actor and musician best known for his work with Spike Jones and His City Slickers and as a film editor for animated cartoons, including Mr. Magoo and several Hanna-Barbera series.

Career 

In 1954, he joined the United_Productions_of_America editing staff, where he mostly worked on voiceovers for commercials. Later, he joined Hanna-Barbera as a sound effects specialist. His career as a film editor included working on the Mr. Magoo series, as well as other animated series such as Frankenstein Jr. and The Impossibles, Fantastic Four (1967 TV series), Cattanooga Cats, Where's Huddles?, CB Bears, and Scooby's All-Star Laff-A-Lympics.

Later life and death 
He died on October 4, 2007, in Woodland Hills, Los Angeles, California, United States.

References

1919 births
2007 deaths
20th-century American comedians
20th-century American musicians